Carioca Bowl is a beach American football league based in Rio de Janeiro, Niterói and Saquarema, in the state of Rio de Janeiro, Brazil. The league's current champions are the America Red Lions.

Teams 

 América Red Lions - plays in Botafogo Beach in Botafogo borough1
 Botafogo Reptiles - plays in Botafogo Beach in Botafogo borough
 Copacabana Eagles - plays in Copacabana Beach in Copacabana borough
 Copacabana Titãs - plays in Copacabana Beach in Copacabana borough
 Falcões - plays in Barra Beach in Barra da Tijuca borough
 Gladiadores
 Gorilas
 Guanabara Bay Buccanons
 Mamutes - plays in Barra Beach in Barra da Tijuca borough
 Niterói Corsários - plays in Niterói
 Niterói Warriors - plays in Icaraí Beach in Icaraí borough (Niterói)
 Piratas - plays in Copacabana Beach in Copacabana borough
 Pitbulls - plays in Barra Beach in Barra da Tijuca borough
 Rio de Janeiro Sharks - plays in Copacabana Beach in Copacabana borough
 Rio de Janeiro Tigers
 Saquarema Vikings - plays in Saquarema
 Tijuca Fênix - plays in Copacabana Beach in Copacabana borough2
 Ilha Avalanche - plays in Ilha do Governador borough

References

1 The Red Lions are sponsored by the soccer club América Football Club.
2 The Fênix plays in Copacabana, but is based in Tijuca borough.

External links 
Rio de Janeiro league in AFAB website

American football in Brazil
Sport in Rio de Janeiro (state)
Sports leagues in Brazil